The Grammy Award for Best New Age, Ambient or Chant Album is presented to recording artists for quality albums in the new-age music genre at the Grammy Awards, a ceremony that was established in 1958 and originally called the Gramophone Awards. Honors in several categories are presented at the ceremony annually by the National Academy of Recording Arts and Sciences of the United States to "honor artistic achievement, technical proficiency and overall excellence in the recording industry, without regard to album sales or chart position".

Originally called the Grammy Award for Best New Age Recording, the honor was first presented to Swiss musician Andreas Vollenweider at the 29th Grammy Awards in 1987 for his album Down to the Moon. Two compilation albums featuring Windham Hill Records artists were nominated that same year. The record label was founded by William Ackerman, later an award nominee and 2005 winner for the album Returning. From 1988 to 1991 the category was known as Best New Age Performance. Since 1992 the award has been presented as Best New Age Album. Beginning in 2001, award recipients included the producers, engineers, and/or mixers associated with the nominated work in addition to the recording artists. As of 2023, the category will be known as Best New Age, Ambient or Chant Album.

While "new-age" music can be difficult to define, journalist Steven Rea described the genre as "music that is acoustic, electronic, jazzy, folky and incorporates classical and pop elements, Eastern and Latin influences, exotic instrumentation and environmental sound effects." According to the category description guide for the 52nd Grammy Awards, the award is presented for instrumental or vocal new-age albums "containing at least 51% playing time of newly recorded material", with seasonal recordings not being eligible. The addition of the award category reflected a "coming of age" of the music genre, though some musicians classified as new age dislike the term "new age" and some of its negative connotations.

Multiple wins
As of 2015, Paul Winter holds the record for the most wins in this category, having won six times (four times as the leader of the group Paul Winter Consort). Winter is the only musician to win the award consecutively; he received an award in 1994 for Spanish Angel as a member of his ensemble and another in 1995 for Prayer for the Wild Things as a solo artist. Irish musician Enya has received four awards. Kitarō holds the record for the most nominations, with sixteen (with only one win, in 2001). All five volumes of Kitarō's Sacred Journey of Ku-Kai series were nominated for Best New Age Album.

Pianist Peter Kater held the record for most nominations without a win, with 12, until he finally won his first Grammy (for Dancing on Water) in 2018. He also holds the record from the most consecutive nominations, with 11, having been nominated every year between 2007 and 2018.

Native American flutist R. Carlos Nakai is the only artist to be nominated for more than one work within the same year—for the 42nd Grammy Awards he was nominated alongside Paul Horn for Inside Monument Valley and for his own album Inner Voices.

Recipients

 Each year is linked to the article about the Grammy Awards held that year.

See also
 List of new-age music artists
 List of New Age topics

References

General
 

Specific

External links
Grammy.com: Best New Age Album at 53rd Annual Grammy Awards Pre-Telecast

 
1987 establishments in the United States
Album awards
Awards established in 1987
New Age Album